Rudolftoppen is a mountain on the island of Jan Mayen. It has a height of 769 m.a.s.l., and is the highest peak in the southern part of the island.

References

Mountains of Norway
Landforms of Jan Mayen